Heels is an American drama television series about professional wrestling created by Michael Waldron that premiered on August 15, 2021, on Starz. In November 2021, the series was renewed for a second season.

Premise
Two brothers and rivals, one a villain, or "heel" in professional wrestling, the other a hero, or "face", play out scripted matches as they war over their late father's wrestling promotion and vie for national attention in small town Georgia.

Cast

Main
 Stephen Amell as Jack Spade, a "heel" in the Duffy Wrestling League (DWL) who is Ace's older brother, and the proprietor of the DWL.
Jaxon McHan as Young Jack Spade 
 Alexander Ludwig as Ace Spade, a "face" in the DWL who is Jack's younger brother.
Mason Gillette as Young Ace Spade
 Alison Luff as Staci Spade, Jack's wife.
 Mary McCormack as Willie Day, Jack's business partner.
 Kelli Berglund as Crystal Tyler, a valet and love interest for Ace.
 Allen Maldonado as Rooster Robbins, a star DWL wrestler.
 James Harrison as Apocalypse, an experienced, disillusioned journeyman wrestler.
 Roxton Garcia as Thomas Spade, son of Jack and Staci Spade
 Chris Bauer as Wild Bill Hancock, a former wrestling star turned pro wrestling scout.

Recurring
 David James Elliott as Tom Spade, Jack and Ace's father, a former wrestler who was the proprietor of the DWL. The character appears in flashbacks, having committed suicide about a year before the events of the series.
Duke Davis Roberts as Big Jim Kitchen, a seasoned wrestler and Ace's best friend.
Trey Tucker as Bobby Pin, wrestles as a face in the ring, but in the locker room he is an intelligent, funny, encouraging colleague and friend.
Robby Ramos as Diego Cottonmouth
 CM Punk as Ricky Rabies, heel pro wrestler.
 Bonnie Somerville as Vicky Rabies, Ricky's valet.
Christian Adam as Gabe
Alice Barrett Mitchell as Carol Spade
Erica Pappas as Melanie Kitchen 
 Mike O'Malley as Charlie Gully, the owner and impresario of Florida Wrestling Dystopia (FWD), a new wrestling promotion more interested in violent spectacle than telling a compelling story.
Jef Holbrook as Todd, host of a YouTube show critical of DWL

Production

Development
On February 17, 2017, it was announced that Starz had given straight-to-series order to Michael Waldron's series. Production companies involved with the series are Paramount Television and LBI Entertainment. On January 7, 2020, Peter Segal replaced Kyle Patrick Alvarez to direct the series. On May 2, 2021, Starz announced the series would premiere on August 15, 2021. On November 3, 2021, Starz renewed the series for a second season. On an episode of Michael Rosenbaum's "Inside of You" podcast released on January 3, 2023, Stephen Amell mentioned that filming of the second season wrapped in July of 2022, but no further information was available regarding a trailer or release date.

Casting
On August 19, 2019, Stephen Amell was cast as Jack Spade. On September 15, 2019, Alexander Ludwig was cast as Ace Spade. On January 7, 2020, Alison Luff was cast as Staci Spade. On March 11, 2020, Chris Bauer, Allen Maldonado, James Harrison, and Kelli Berglund joined the cast. On August 25, 2020, Mary McCormack was cast as Willie, Jack's business partner.

Episodes

Release 
Heels debuted on Starz on August 15, 2021, and the season 1 finale aired on October 10, 2021.

Reception 
Heels was met with a highly positive response from critics. On Rotten Tomatoes, the series has an approval rating of 96% based on reviews from 25 critics, with an average rating of 8/10. The critics consensus reads, "Stephen Amell and Alexander Ludwig sell hard in Heels, an impressive new drama that has compelling angles on both sides of the rope." On Metacritic, the series has a weighted average score of 73 out of 100 based on reviews from 12 critics, indicating "generally favorable reviews."

References

External links
 
 
 

2020s American drama television series
2021 American television series debuts
Television productions suspended due to the COVID-19 pandemic
American professional wrestling television series
English-language television shows
Starz original programming
Television series by Lionsgate Television
Television series by Paramount Television
Television shows set in Georgia (U.S. state)